Villers-Brûlin is a commune in the Pas-de-Calais department in the Hauts-de-France region of France.

Geography

Population

Places of interest
 The church of Notre-Dame, dating from the seventeenth century.
 A sixteenth-century chateau.

See also
Communes of the Pas-de-Calais department

References

Villersbrulin